The North East Ambulance Service NHS Foundation Trust (NEAS) is an NHS foundation trust responsible for providing NHS ambulance services in North East England. Headquartered in Newcastle upon Tyne, NEAS provides emergency medical services to the metropolitan boroughs of Newcastle upon Tyne, Gateshead, North Tyneside, South Tyneside and City of Sunderland; the ceremonial counties of County Durham and Northumberland; and the area of  North Yorkshire commonly known as Teesside. NEAS was formed on 1 July 2006, following the merger of the existing North East Ambulance Service with the Tees division of the Tees, East and North Yorkshire Ambulance Service (TENYAS). Northumbria Ambulance Service and County Durham Ambulance Service had previously merged on 1 April 1999. 

NEAS is one of ten Ambulance Trusts providing England with emergency medical services, receiving direct government funding for its role. NEAS also provides patient transport services (PTS), or non-emergency services, to patients in the area.

Performance

NEAS was one of four trusts in the country to receive a "good" rating in the 2006/7 Healthcare Commission Healthcheck report.
This was the highest rating achieved by any ambulance service for provision of care.

Between April and October 2013, the service recorded 10,072 "incidents" in which handovers to hospital accident and emergency departments had taken longer than 30minutes and 499 which took longer than one hour resulting in penalty fines of approximately £250,000 for the service.

In 2018, the trust said it would need to recruit 100 more paramedics in order to meet new ambulance performance targets.

The effect of the COVID-19 pandemic in England was that delayed ambulance response times became a "continuing theme due to the unprecedented demand the service is currently experiencing”. In response to repeated complaints about patient harm the trust reported that “on each occasion demand outweighed available resources at the time these patients required an emergency ambulance” and that the board “can take assurance that in each of these cases no missed opportunities were found to send an ambulance sooner”.  In January 2022 call handlers were told they should consider asking patients with suspected strokes and heart attacks to be transported by friends or family because ambulance response times were under such pressure.

CQC performance rating
In its last inspection of the service in October 2018, the Care Quality Commission (CQC) gave the following ratings on a scale of outstanding (the service is performing exceptionally well), good (the service is performing well and meeting our expectations), requires improvement (the service isn't performing as well as it should) and inadequate (the service is performing badly):

Services provided 
999 emergency service
Hazardous Area Response Team
NHS 111 service 
Patient Transport Service
Durham Urgent Care Transport (DUCT)

Locations and dispatch desk areas 
The main trust HQ is currently based at Bernicia House on Newburn Riverside, Newcastle upon Tyne.

There are three control rooms currently operating for NEAS, one at the Newcastle upon Tyne HQ at Bernicia House in Newburn, one at Russell House in Hebburn and one at Winter House in Billingham.  999 emergency calls and NHS 111 urgent care calls are answered by call takers at all three sites. 

North East Ambulance Service is split into three divisions or dispatch desk areas. These are the NEAS ambulance stations including the dispatch desk they would come under in the control room.

There are several stations across the North East run jointly with the local fire services such as Tyne and Wear Fire and Rescue Service and County Durham and Darlington Fire and Rescue Service.

Popular culture 
NEAS is to feature as the host service of the ninth and tenth seasons of the BBC TV series Ambulance, with filming taking place until April 2022.

See also
 Emergency medical services in the United Kingdom
 List of NHS trusts

References

External links 
 
 North East Ambulance Service on the NHS website
 Inspection reports from the Care Quality Commission

NHS ambulance services trusts
Organisations based in Northumberland
NHS foundation trusts
Health in Northumberland
Health in County Durham
Ambulance services in England